Group B nerve fibers are axons, which are moderately myelinated, which means less myelinated than group A nerve fibers, and more myelinated than group C nerve fibers. Their conduction velocity is 3 to 14 m/s. They are usually general visceral afferent fibers and preganglionic nerve fibers of the autonomic nervous system. They are used in Bainbridge reflex as afferents.

Neurohistology